, abbreviated to  or YNU, is a national university located in Yokohama, Kanagawa Prefecture, Japan. Founded in 1876, it became a national university in 1949, and currently comprises five graduate schools and four undergraduate faculties.

The university has been evaluated highly from the business world and was ranked first in Kantō (including Greater Tokyo Area) and Kōshin'etsu region and second in Japan by personnel departments of leading companies in Japan in 2020. The university was also ranked tenth in Japan according to the ratio of the number of officers and managers produced to the number of graduates.

History

The predecessor of the university, Yokohama Normal School, was founded in 1876. It became a Japanese national university in 1949 by the amalgamation of Kanagawa Normal School, Kanagawa Youth Normal School, Yokohama College of Economics and the Yokohama Institute of Technology.

The university was originally planned to be named as "Yokohama University", but at the time the former Yokohama City Economics College and Yokohama Vocational School also wanted to apply their names as Yokohama University. They had a consultation about the name and decided not to use name "Yokohama University".

The Faculty of Business Administration was founded in 1967. The university has master's degree programs in engineering (1962), economics (1972), business administration (1972), and education (1979). The Institute of Environmental Science and Technology was established in 1973 under the botanist Akira Miyawaki, and the Graduate School of International and Business Law was established in 1990. The Graduate School of International Development Studies was created in 1994 and the School of Law in 2004.

Faculties 
Faculty of Education and Human Sciences 
Faculty of Economics
Faculty of Business Administration 
School of Engineering Science
College of Urban Sciences

Graduate Schools 
Graduate School of Education 
International Graduate School of Social Sciences 
Graduate School of Engineering/ Faculty of Engineering 
Graduate School of Environment and Information Sciences/ Faculty of Environment and Information Sciences
Graduate School of Urban Innovation
YNU Interfaculty Graduate School

College and Faculty of Economics 
Established in 1949 as one of the three original colleges, the College of Economics follows the great tradition of the former Yokohama Commercial College. The college (undergraduate) prides itself in contributing to the advancement of economic theory and empirics. Every year many aspiring students apply for entrance, and after an intensive four-year period of training in economic thought and research, they successfully graduate as competent experts in their fields. Recognized internationally as a center of economic study, an array of nationalities are represented in the college as lecturers, researchers and students. The College of Economics promotes cultural diversity and host many international students both on scholarships and self-funded. At the Master's level, the Faculty of Economics is host to the Joint Japan World Bank Graduate Scholarship Program. In the fall of 2013, YNU Economics began offering M.A. and Ph.D. degrees where the course content, advising, etc. is offered entirely in the English language.

Faculty of Business Administration
Yokohama National University's Faculty of Business Administration was established in 1967, and currently composed of four disciplinary areas: the Division of Business Administration, the Division of Accounting and Information, the Division of Management System Science and the Division of International Business. The faculty places emphasis on internationalization, with not only Japanese students, but also many students from overseas currently enrolled. Students are free to register subjects outside of their own division, and so are able to gain an education that covers all aspects of business administration. In the latter half of second year, students are assigned to a seminar, where they do research in a specialized area of an advising professor.

College of Urban Sciences
Urban Sciences is an academic field that focuses on an important theme—how cities should be in the future—from a scientific point of view. The College of Urban Sciences was newly established in April 2017, and comprises the following four departments: (1) the Department of Urban and Social Collaboration for studying cultural and social sciences, with the objective of create a pleasant urban society and culture; (2) the Department of Architecture and Building Science for studying creative architecture, urban environments, and town development; (3) the Department of Civil Engineering for studying technology and management relating to the infrastructure supporting urban activities; and (4) the Department of Risk Management and Environmental Science for studying sustainable urban development with the understanding of natural and social environmental risks. The college pursues the development of talented people who can commit themselves to creating cities from broad perspectives that include liberal arts and scientific viewpoint.

Evaluation from Business World

Notable alumni

Takuzo Aida polymer chemist in University of Tokyo
Akira Fujishima chemist, and the President of Tokyo University of Science
Koshi Inaba lead singer of the rock duo B'z
Shunji Iwai film director
Katsuhiko Kawasoe former President and chief executive officer of Mitsubishi Motors
Le Thi Tuyet Mai, Ambassador and Permanent Representative of the Permanent Mission of Viet Nam to the United Nations Office and the World Trade Organization
Kaori Manabe Japanese television personality and model
Chisato Minamimura dancer and choreographer
Masaya Nakamura the founder of Namco Co., Ltd and the "Father of Pacman".
Ryue Nishizawa a professor of Yokohama National University and Architect (awarded the Pritzker Prize)
Sumio Mabuchi Japanese politician of the Democratic Party of Japan
Hironobu Sakaguchi game designer
Shinichiro Sakurai automotive engineer
Akira Satō photographer
Hiromichi Tanaka game designer

External links

University website

References

 
Japanese national universities
Educational institutions established in 1876
American football in Japan
1876 establishments in Japan